Verkhnebikkuzino (Ürge Bikquja) is a rural locality (a village) in Nizhnebikkuzinsky Selsoviet, Kugarchinsky District, Bashkortostan, Russia. The population was 214 as of 2010. There are 3 streets.

Geography 
Verkhnebikkuzino is located 50 km north of Mrakovo (the district's administrative centre) by road. Syrtlanovo is the nearest rural locality.

References 

Rural localities in Kugarchinsky District